José Luis Clerc (born 16 August 1958) is a former professional tennis player from Argentina. He reached a career-high Association of Tennis Professionals (ATP) world No. 4 singles ranking on 3 August 1981, following a run of 25 consecutive match wins after Wimbledon.

Tennis career
Clerc represented Argentina for the Davis Cup from 1976 to 1989. He and Guillermo Vilas led Argentina to its first Davis Cup final in 1981 to set up a tie against United States in Cincinnati, Ohio. After Vilas lost the first rubber in straight sets to John McEnroe, Clerc defeated Roscoe Tanner in straight sets in the second rubber to level the tie. During the third rubber, partnering Vilas, the pair lost to Fleming/McEnroe in doubles, 9–11 in the fifth and deciding set. Clerc then played McEnroe in the fourth rubber and eventually lost in 5 sets.

Clerc, with Vilas and Carlos Gattiker, made the final of 1980 World Team Cup in Düsseldorf. Clerc defeated former French Open champion Adriano Panatta 7–6, 6–3. Argentina eventually beat Italy 3–0 to claim the title.

In 1981, Clerc entered the French Open with an 11-match win streak and defeated Jimmy Connors in the quarterfinals, 4–6, 6–2, 4–6, 7–5, 6–0, to extend it to 16. The streak ended when Clerc lost in five sets against Ivan Lendl. Later that year, starting after Wimbledon, Clerc won another 28 consecutive matches before losing in the third round of the US Open.

In 1982, Clerc reached the semifinals of the French Open for the second consecutive year, losing to 17-year-old Swedish teenager Mats Wilander in four sets. Wilander would go on to beat Vilas in the final in 4 sets to become the youngest winner of a Grand Slam at the time.

Injuries began to plague Clerc since 1984, and his consistency dropped. Clerc never recovered and only played sporadically after 1985.

He received the ATP Sportsmanship Award in 1981, and Argentine Konex Awards in 1980 and 1990.

ATP career finals

Singles: 35 (25 titles, 10 runners-up)

Performance timeline

Singles

Notable rivalries

Clerc vs. Vilas 
Clerc and Guillermo Vilas played each other 14 times in their careers, with Vilas leading 10–4. Vilas being a dominant force on clay for much of the second half of 1970s, Clerc was considered a rising star on clay during that time. All of their 14 meetings came after the quarterfinal stages (with one exception, which was at the Masters Grand Prix) and included eight finals. Vilas won their first six encounters before 1980, including four finals. However, since 1980, they had a tied record of 4–4, with Clerc winning all four of the finals.

Personal life
Clerc married Annelie Czerner in 1980, and they have two sons and a daughter: Juan Pablo Clerc (born 23 September 1981), Dominique Clerc (born 12 January 1984), and Nicolás Clerc (born 19 October 1990). In 2005, they divorced, Clerc married with Gisela Medrano in 2008, with whom they have a daughter named Sophie (born 7 April 2011).

Clerc runs a tennis school in Argentina, participates in senior tournaments, and regularly serves as a tennis analyst for ESPN Latin America and ESPN Deportes. He also coaches Sebastian Baez.

References

External links
 
 
 
Clerc's Konex Awards (Spanish)
1980 Argentina's World Team Cup
Interview 
 Algodon Wine Estates website

1958 births
Living people
Argentine male tennis players
Argentine people of French descent
Tennis players from Buenos Aires